{{DISPLAYTITLE:C815H1317N233O241S5}}
The molecular formula C815H1317N233O241S5 (molar mass: 18396.1 g/mol) may refer to:

 Darbepoetin alfa
 Epoetin alfa

Molecular formulas